The Detroit salt mine is a salt mine located  below Detroit, Michigan. The mine opened in 1910 and covers  underground. In the beginning, the leather and food industries were the primary customers. Today, road deicing salt is the primary product.

History
Rock salt was discovered in 1895. The Detroit Salt and Manufacturing Company was formed to extract the salt. The company went bankrupt before finishing the shaft down to the salt. A new company was formed and the shaft was completed in 1910. A second larger shaft was completed in 1925. The first shaft was relegated to hauling workers and materials. By the late 1950s, the company operated through both shafts, which are about 1100 feet deep. The mine was closed from 1983 to 1998, when production was restarted to produce road deicing salt. In October 2010, the Detroit Salt Co., LLC, was acquired by the Kissner Group of Canada for an undisclosed price.

See also
 Michigan Basin

References

External links
 Time magazine photo essay: Underground Economy: The Big Salt Mine in Detroit
 Detroit Salt Company

Mines in Michigan
Buildings and structures in Detroit
Salt mines in the United States